Gene Dornink (born December 30, 1962) is a Minnesota politician and member of the Minnesota Senate. A Republican, he represents District 27, which includes all of Freeborn and Mower counties and parts of Dodge, Faribault, and Steele counties in southeastern Minnesota.

Minnesota Senate 
Dornink defeated Democratic incumbent Dan Sparks in the 2020 election.

Personal life 
Dornink and his wife, Vicky, have 12 children. They reside in Brownsdale.

Electoral history

References

External links 

Living people
Republican Party Minnesota state senators
21st-century American politicians
People from Hayfield, Minnesota
People from Austin, Minnesota
1962 births